is a former Japanese football player. He played for Japan national team.

Club career
Sawada was born in Kamakura on May 15, 1970. After graduating from Chuo University, he joined Japan Football League club Kashiwa Reysol in 1993. He played as right-midfielder and right side-back. The club won the 2nd place in 1994 and was promoted to J1 League. He moved to Sanfrecce Hiroshima in 1999. He retired end of 2003 season.

National team career
On September 20, 1995, Sawada debuted for Japan national team against Paraguay. He also played in 1996. He played four games for Japan until 1996.

Club statistics

National team statistics

References

External links
 
 Japan National Football Team Database
 

1970 births
Living people
People from Kamakura
Chuo University alumni
Association football people from Kanagawa Prefecture
Japanese footballers
Japan international footballers
J1 League players
J2 League players
Japan Football League (1992–1998) players
Kashiwa Reysol players
Sanfrecce Hiroshima players
Association football midfielders
Association football defenders
Japanese football managers
J1 League managers
Sanfrecce Hiroshima managers